Filatima sciocrypta is a moth of the family Gelechiidae. It is found in China (Shandong, Jilin).

References

Moths described in 1936
Filatima